Aristotelia iomarmara is a moth of the family Gelechiidae. It was described by Edward Meyrick in 1921. It is found in Australia, where it has been recorded from Queensland.

The wingspan is about 8 mm. The forewings are light ochreous grey, irregularly sprinkled and strigulated with darker grey, with strong purple reflections. The second discal stigma is dark grey. The hindwings are light grey.

References

Moths described in 1921
Aristotelia (moth)
Moths of Australia